Brandon Soo Hoo (born November 2, 1995) is an American actor and martial artist known for playing Tran in the 2008 film Tropic Thunder and for his series regular role on the Cartoon Network sketch comedy series Incredible Crew. Soo Hoo played Scott Fuller on the El Rey Network horror-drama series From Dusk till Dawn: The Series, based on the film of the same name.

Early life
Brandon Soo Hoo was born in Pasadena, California on November 2, 1995. He is of Chinese descent.

Career
Brandon began his acting career at the age of 10, when he was featured in television advertisements for Toys "R" Us, Land Rover, and ExxonMobil. In 2007, he had a minor role on Sesame Street. Soo Hoo made his feature film debut in Ben Stiller's comedy film Tropic Thunder (2008), playing the role of Tran, a young leader of the Flaming Dragon gang; he won a Young Artist Award for his performance. In 2009, he portrayed Young Storm Shadow in the action film G.I. Joe: The Rise of Cobra, and was again nominated for a Young Artist Award for his performance.

Soo Hoo guest starred on the NBC comedy series My Name is Earl and the Fox sitcom 'Til Death. In 2010, he had guest starring role on NBC's comedy series Community. Soo Hoo then had a recurring role as Connor on Nickelodeon's Supah Ninjas. In 2013, he co-starred as Fly Molo in the science fiction film Ender's Game, alongside Harrison Ford, Ben Kingsley, and Asa Butterfield. Soo Hoo was then part of the regular cast of the Cartoon Network sketch comedy series Incredible Crew, created by Nick Cannon.

From 2014 to 2016, he starred as Scott Fuller on the El Rey Network horror-drama series From Dusk till Dawn: The Series, a television adaptation of Robert Rodriguez's film of the same name. In 2015, he starred as Seth in the film Everything Before Us. In 2016, he provided the voice of Garfield Logan / Beast Boy in the DC Comics animated direct-to-video film Justice League vs. Teen Titans.

In September 2018, he appeared in a Wong Fu Production video Asian Bachelorette 2, a sequel to Asian Bachelorette.

Personal life
Soo Hoo is a practitioner of taekwondo.

Filmography

References

External links
 

1995 births
American male actors of Chinese descent
21st-century American male actors
American male child actors
American male film actors
American male television actors
American male voice actors
American male taekwondo practitioners
American Wing Chun practitioners
Chinese Wing Chun practitioners
Living people
Male actors from Pasadena, California